Pandolfo Petrucci (14 February 1452 – 21 May 1512) was a ruler of the Italian Republic of Siena during the Renaissance.

Biography
Born and raised in Siena, a member of an aristocratic family, Petrucci was exiled from his home in 1483 for being a member of the city's Noveschi political faction, which had fallen out of favor with the rulers of Siena.  When the Noveschi returned to prominence, Petrucci became their chief and returned to Siena in 1487.  He later became captain of the city guard in 1495.

Rise to power

When his brother Giacoppo (one of Siena's most powerful residents) died in 1497, Petrucci assumed all of his offices and seized control of his fortune.  His power and wealth increased even further with his marriage to Aurelia Borghese, daughter of the powerful Niccolò Borghese.  With his father-in-law's backing, Petrucci assumed a number of public offices and gained a vast amount of political power.  He subsequently used this power to sell public offices or to give them to his lackeys, a strategy which allowed him to become the most powerful man in Siena.  However, Petrucci's power and his organization of followers in Siena's government gained him many enemies, including his father-in-law.  Niccolò and other influential citizens of Siena conspired to assassinate Petrucci, but Petrucci uncovered the plot and had Niccolò murdered in 1500.

With his enemies out of the way, Petrucci ruled as absolute tyrant over Siena.  Petrucci subsequently stopped selling public offices in order to consolidate his own power.  Although a brutal authoritarian and absolutist, Petrucci was careful to pacify the people of Siena by improving the city's economy and encouraging the advancement of art.  He also managed to avoid a war with Florence, which had been at odds with Siena for over a century due to a dispute over Siena's control of Montepulciano.  When France and Spain invaded the Italian Peninsula, Petrucci became involved in a number of political intrigues.   During this time period, Petrucci tried to gain the powerful Cesare Borgia's trust by diplomatically procuring French-controlled Piombino for Borgia.  However, he secretly plotted against Borgia in the hopes of increasing his own power.  Borgia, who had never trusted Petrucci, learned of the Sienese tyrant's plans and invited him to a meeting at Senigallia in 1502, where Petrucci would have been assassinated along with Cesare's other enemies.  Petrucci suspected his life was in danger and avoided the meeting, but nevertheless fled Siena in January 1503 in order to appease Borgia.  He subsequently resided in Lucca.  With the assistance of his ally King Louis XII of France, however, Petrucci was returned to power two months later.

Later years

With Borgia's death in 1507, Petrucci became one of the most powerful men in Italy.  In his final years, Petrucci supported Pisa militarily in its war against Florence.  However, Pope Julius II and Spain obliged Petrucci to make peace with Florence, to which he reluctantly gave the territory of Montepulciano in 1512.  In return, the pope made Petrucci's nephew a cardinal.  Later that year, Petrucci handed control of Siena over to his son, Borghese Petrucci, and died shortly afterwards in San Quirico d'Orcia, Italy.  Before his death, Petrucci was known to have plotted in secret with Spain and Pope Julius II against his old allies, the French.  He was also rumoured to have had Pope Pius III poisoned in 1503.

Following Pandolfo's death, the Petrucci family ruled Siena until 1524.

References

1452 births
1512 deaths
People from Siena
Italian politicians
Pandolfo